Burnin' is an album by the blues musician John Lee Hooker, recorded in Chicago in 1961 and released on the Vee-Jay label the following year. Hooker is backed by the Funk Brothers. The album includes the nationally charting single "Boom Boom".

Reception

The Penguin Guide to Blues Recordings wrote: "Burnin'  is another album cut at a single session but it has more texture and spirit than Travelin'. Hooker presides over 11 tracks of uncomplicated danceable music, pushed by the saxes". AllMusic reviewer Al Campbell stated: "Burnin' was released in 1962 and combines 12 tracks of electric material performed by Hooker backed by a band... recommended".

Track listing
All compositions credited to John Lee Hooker
 "Boom Boom" – 2:32
 "Process" – 3:49
 "Lost a Good Girl" – 2:51
 "A New Leaf" – 2:30
 "Blues Before Sunrise" – 3:49
 "Let's Make It" – 2:27
 "I Got a Letter" – 2:44
 "Thelma" – 3:31
 "Drug Store Woman" – 2:47
 "Keep Your Hands to Yourself" – 2:10
 "What Do You Say" – 2:27

Personnel

Performance
John Lee Hooker – guitar, vocals
Hank Cosby – tenor saxophone
Andrew "Mike" Terry – baritone saxophone
Joe Hunter – piano
Larry Veeder – guitar
James Jamerson – bass
Benny Benjamin – drums

References

John Lee Hooker albums
1962 albums
Vee-Jay Records albums